Kalia (Punjabi) is a 1984 Pakistani, action drama and musical film directed by Waheed Dar and produced by Faqooq Malik. Film starring actor Sultan Rahi, Mumtaz, Mustafa Qureshi, and Iqbal Hassan.

Inspiration
The film is dedicated to the dutiful jawans of the law enforcement agencies of Pakistan.

Cast

 Sultan Rahi as Kalia
 Mumtaz as Chanda
 Mustafa Qureshi as Jamal
 Nazli as Jamal's love interest
 Iqbal Hassan as Akoo
 Afzaal Ahmed as DSP
 Ilyas Kashmiri as Chaudhry Balandbakht
 Talat Siddiqui as mother of Kalia
 Sawan as Dara daku
 Tani Begum as 
 Talish  (Guests actor appearance)
 Adeeb as heera daku
 Jaggi Malik
 Altaf Khan
 Zahir Shah
 Seema
 Sajjad Kausar
 Ahmad Rahi  (child actor)
 Gulzar
 Ali Ahmad

Soundtrack
The music of Kalia is composed by Wajahat Attre with lyrics penned by Waris Ludhianvi and Khawaja Pervez and singers are Noor Jehan and Naheed Akhtar.

Track listing

References

External links

1980s masala films
Pakistani action drama films
Pakistani musical films
1984 films
Punjabi-language Pakistani films
1980s Punjabi-language films